Anguissola is a surname. Notable people with the surname include:

Elena Anguissola ( 1532–1584), Italian painter and nun
Lucia Anguissola (1536/1538– 1565–1568), Italian painter
Sofonisba Anguissola ( 1532–1625), Italian painter

See also
Palazzo Anguissola